Richard Raymond Werenski (born December 22, 1991) is an American professional golfer.

Early life
Werenski was born in Springfield, Massachusetts, but grew up in South Hadley and played golf at The Orchards Golf Club. He played college golf at Georgia Tech. He won the 2012 Porter Cup.

Professional career
Werenski turned professional after graduating from Georgia Tech in 2014. He won his first two professional events, the Cutter Creek Classic, on the NGA Pro Golf Tour, and the Vermont Open; he added another NGA Pro Golf Tour win in July 2014.

In early 2015, Werenski won the Golf Channel's reality show Big Break The Palm Beaches, FL. As the winner of The Big Break, he earned entry into the Barbasol Championship. He made the cut, finishing T72 in his first PGA Tour event.

Werenski earned his 2015 Web.com Tour card through qualifying school. He won for the first - and only - time on the Web.com Tour at the 2016 BMW Charity Pro-Am. He finished the 2016 regular season second on the money list, which automatically earned him his PGA Tour card for 2017 as a Web.com graduate.

On the PGA Tour in 2017, Werenski had a solid rookie year with three top-10s, including a playoff loss at the Barracuda Championship. He made the 2017 FedEx Cup Playoffs and finished the season 106th in points to retain his card for 2018. In 2018, he had another solid season, carding two top-10s, including another T-2 finish (this time at the Barbasol Championship), and made the playoffs again. He finished 110th in points and retained his card for 2019.

In October 2019,  Werenski broke a wrist in a car accident. He returned to the PGA Tour in January 2020. At the 3M Open in July 2020, he led the field after the first round, was tied for the lead after the second and third rounds, and finished with a T-3. 

On August 2, 2020, Werenski won the PGA Tour's opposite field event, the Barracuda Championship on Tahoe Mountain Club's Old Greenwood Course in Truckee, California. He holed a flop shot from the fairway on the par-4 16th for a five-point eagle and birdied the last for a one-point victory over Troy Merritt. Werenski won the event three years after losing to Chris Stroud on the second hole of a playoff. The win made Werenski one of the last entrants into the 2020 PGA Championship.

Amateur wins
2012 Porter Cup

Professional wins (5)

PGA Tour wins (1)

PGA Tour playoff record (0–1)

Web.com Tour wins (1)

NGA Pro Golf Tour wins (2)
2014 Cutter Creek Classic, Seven Lakes NGA Classic

Other wins (1)
2014 Vermont Open

Results in major championships
Results not in chronological order before 2019 and in 2020.

CUT = missed the halfway cut
NT = No tournament due to COVID-19 pandemic

Results in The Players Championship

"T" indicates a tie for a place
CUT = missed the halfway cut
C = Canceled after the first round due to the COVID-19 pandemic

See also
2016 Web.com Tour Finals graduates
2019 Korn Ferry Tour Finals graduates

References

External links

American male golfers
Georgia Tech Yellow Jackets men's golfers
PGA Tour golfers
Korn Ferry Tour graduates
Golfers from Massachusetts
Golfers from Florida
Sportspeople from Springfield, Massachusetts
People from Jupiter, Florida
1991 births
Living people